Digilogue is a music album of recordings which became the twentieth commercial release by the British avant-garde music group :zoviet*france:. It was first released in 1996 in limited edition 12 inch clear vinyl format by the United States record label,  Soleilmoon Recordings. Subsequently, a CD version was released in 1998 by Soleilmoon Recordings, with additional tracks. The album reach #73 on the CMJ Radio Top 200 charts in the U.S.

"Amber", from the CD version of the album, was used as the soundtrack to The Shop Floor, a video production by the artist Francis Gomila (UK, 2003).

Production details

1996 edition
Label:  Soleilmoon Recordings
Catalogue number: SOLV004
Format: 12 inch clear vinyl with banana paper sleeve in clear vinyl sleeve
Artwork: original artwork and design by :zoviet*France:

1998 edition
Label: Soleilmoon Recordings (US)
Catalogue number: SOL 62 CD
UPC: 753907776225
Format: compact disc with printed card inserts
Artwork: original artwork and design by :zoviet*France:
Total running time: 00:67:52

Track listing

Vinyl album
 "Alchemagenta"
 "Angel's Pin Number"
 "Haze Polder"
 "Carbon"
 "Resin (Amber)"

Compact disc
 '"Alchemagenta"
 "Haze Polder"
"Soft Helion"
"Another Soft Helion"
 "Angel's Pin Number"
 "Carbon"
 "Amber"
"Init"

References 

1996 albums
1998 albums
Zoviet France albums